Mokujin (Japanese: 木人（もくじん）, lit. "wood-person") is a fictional character  in Namco Bandai Games' Tekken video game series. Mokujin first appeared in the 1997 video game Tekken 3. Mokujin does not have his own fighting style. Instead, he mimics fighting styles from other characters, which varies from match to match.

Appearances

In Tekken video game series
Mokujin is a training dummy made from a 2,000-year-old tree. He comes alive in the presence of great evil and it was said that he would become the world's last resort when humanity is unable to deal with them. While he appears to be mute (his "voice" is the sounds of wood-clicks), he is able to communicate with the humans using telepathy. Due to his experience as a dummy, he is able to imitate any fighting style. In Tekken 3, Mokujin is awakened when Ogre, the God of Fighting, was released. After Jin Kazama defeated True Ogre in The King of Iron Fist Tournament 3, Mokujin grew lifeless once more, but he had a smile on his face. In Tekken 5, with the awakening of another powerful evil entity (Jinpachi Mishima), Mokujin has come to life once more. After the defeat of Jinpachi Mishima, Mokujin again became lifeless. In Tekken 6, Mokujin again comes to life when a being of great evil and the source of Devil Gene, Azazel awakened. Other than the main series, Mokujin appears in the non-canonical game Tekken Tag Tournament and its sequel Tekken Tag Tournament 2. He also appears as one of the unplayable penultimate bosses in free-to-play game Tekken Revolution.

Tetsujin
 first appearing in Tekken Tag Tournament. Whereas Mokujin is constructed of wood, Tetsujin is constructed of iron. Both characters use the fighting styles of the other characters, and they both switch fighting styles between each round. While Mokujin's "fighting style" is referred as "Mokujin-ken", Tetsujin's is called "Tetsujin-ken", and similarly is the only sentence written in the movelist screen. He rarely appears in subsequent games, although Mokujin can be customized to look like Tetsujin in later installments. Tetsujin also appears as one of the unplayable penultimate bosses in free-to-play game Tekken Revolution and Tekken (Mobile).

Kinjin
 is a secret unplayable boss character in free-to-play game Tekken Revolution. His design is likely based on an easter egg in the console version of Tekken Tag Tournament, where meeting certain requirements would cause Tetsujin's normally silver color to turn gold. In Tekken Revolution, he is basically Tetsujin made of gold wearing a crown, glasses, mustache, bow tie, and a cape. He is one of the Stage 7 penultimate bosses in Arcade mode, along with Mokujin, Tetsujin, Heihachi Mishima, and Jinpachi Mishima.

Other appearances
Mokujin appears in Namco x Capcom as a training dummy. In Street Fighter X Tekken, Pac-Man fights using a small mech designed to resemble a Mokujin. Outside of the video games, Mokujin appears in the 2011 CGI film Tekken: Blood Vengeance as the mascot of Kyoto International School Festival, which the main characters attend. Later, it is revealed that the Kyoto Temple hides a tomb of the ancient spirits of Mokujin, which takes form of the forest surrounding the temple. Heihachi exploits this to fight Devil Jin, though he fails and the spirit presumably vanishes. Mokujin also is referenced in the Ridge Racer series, as branding in signs and in the Kamata Fiera in Ridge Racer 7. Mokujin also appears in Idea Factory's Trillion: God of Destruction, as a training dummy capable of taking the form of the titular monster for training purposes. Mokujin makes a cameo appearance in Pokken Tournament in the background of one of the game's fighting stages.

A Mokujin-esque character also appears in Kyary Pamu Pamu's video "Harajuku Iyahoi".

Reception
Gaming Target ranked Mokujin seventh on the list of top 11 Tekken fighters. GamesRadar listed the character on its "28 of the most favourite video game trees ever", a compilation of answers for the question "what is your favourite video game tree and why?". 1UP.com mentioned him as one of the characters they wanted to see in Street Fighter X Tekken, adding Mokujin provides "a challenge to expert players who want to prove they've mastered everyone in the game." 

Complex ranked the fact Mokujin having breasts in Tekken 6 as the thirteenth Tekkens craziest moment, saying "we haven't been this disturbed since we saw Howard the Duck with its naughty duck tits scene." In 2012, she was listed as one of the most "ridiculous" Tekken Tag Tournament 2 characters by Game Informer, who stated, a "training dummy" can not have its own fighting style, and if it has it should be called "Stand motionless and get the crap kicked out of you because you're a stupid training dummy." Computer and Video Games agreed with his Game Informer fellow, putting Mokujin in their list of "Tekkens worst ever characters", adding "when humanity's best hope against a fire-breathing monster is made of wood and twigs, it's probably time to think about just buying a gun."  GameDaily ranked Mokujin nineteenth on their "Top 25 Most Bizarre Fighting Characters". Mokujin was elected as the fifth "PlayStation's scariest character" by PlayStation Official Magazine because he can copy the enemies moves and change his gender.

References

Anthropomorphic video game characters
Fictional dolls and dummies
Fictional trees
Male characters in video games
Plant characters
Tekken characters
Video game characters introduced in 1997
Fictional Japanese people in video games